Dolores Morato Honrado Vera was a Filipino film studio executive.

Career
She would head Sampaguita Pictures as its president and executive producer from 1956, the death of her husband José O. Vera. She would introduce a "morality clause" for Sampaguita's contract stars where signees had to adhere to moral standards or risk suspension or expulsion. She would be awarded the Presidential Medal of Merit and Citation from President Carlos P. Garcia for her work.

Death
Vera died on May 15, 1980. Her daughter Marichu Maceda would take over Sampaguita.

Personal life
Vera was married to José O. Vera who was also a Senate of the Philippines.

References

Filipino film studio executives
1980 deaths